Euaspilates is a genus of moths in the family Geometridae described by Packard in 1874.

Species
 Euaspilates spinataria Packard, 1874

References

Ourapterygini